Terebellides stroemii is a species of polychaete worms in the family Trichobranchidae.

References

External links 

 

Terebellida
Fauna of the Atlantic Ocean
Animals described in 1835
Taxa named by Michael Sars